Erikson is a popular surname, and also refers to:

 Leif Erikson Day
 Erikson Institute